Zarina Diyas was the defending champion, however she chose to participate at the 2015 Miami Open instead.

Elizaveta Kulichkova won the title, defeating Jeļena Ostapenko in the final, 6–1, 5–7, 7–5.

Seeds

Main draw

Finals

Top half

Bottom half

References

Sources 
 Main draw

Blossom Cup - Singles
Industrial Bank Cup